Barrington High School (formerly known as West Barrington Senior High School) is a public high school located in Barrington, a town in Bristol County, Rhode Island. Barrington High School is the only high school of the Barrington Public Schools district, enrolling 1028 students in grades 9-12. Barrington High School's school colors are blue and gold, and its mascot is the Eagle.

During the early 1950s, Barrington's population began to grow as a result of the increasing availability of the automobile and the baby boom. Barrington High School was the first of many public schools constructed during this period to accommodate the now larger populace.

Barrington High School has been noted for academic success; U.S. News & World Report ranked Barrington as the best high school in Rhode Island. In its 2014 list of "America's Top High Schools", Newsweek ranked Barrington High School as No. 200 out of an analysis of 500 schools across the United States. Beginning in 2017, the school began implementing a "de-leveling" program which removed advanced courses and ultimately all honors programs. Thereafter, the school's academic rating dropped precipitously in the U.S. News & World Report, to #308 in 2022.  As a result of parents' pushback against this, the school reversed course and said honors programs will be reinstated in the 2022-2023 school year.

History

Leander R. Peck Memorial School
In 1870, a Brown University alumnus named Isaac F. Cady established the Prince Hill Family and Day School. After the school closed in 1880, the now unused building was put to use as the first public school of Barrington in 1884; the school later moved to the recently constructed town hall in 1888. In 1916, the grounds for a new high school were donated by Sarah Gould Peck in memory of her late husband, Leander R. Peck, a wealthy wool salesman and longtime Barrington resident. After a year of construction, Leander R. Peck Memorial School was opened on September 14, 1917. The Leander R. Peck Memorial School was used as Barrington's high school from 1917 until 1951, expanded in 1925 and again in 1935.

Barrington High School
During the 1950s, Barrington's population grew as a result of the post-World War II baby boom and the increasing availability of the automobile. To facilitate the education of this increased population, new public schools were constructed throughout the 1950s. Barrington High School was constructed in 1951, the first of the modern Barrington public schools. In 1964, a construction project doubled the size of the original building; twenty years later, the library was expanded in addition to renovation of the art and science rooms. In 1999, the school completed a $14.25 million (equivalent to $ million in ) expansion/renovation project, which included new classrooms, administration and guidance offices, a renovated auditorium, and several other expansions/renovations throughout the building.

Academics

Awards
Barrington High School has been deemed a National Blue Ribbon School, and has received a gold rating from U.S News & World Report. In 2014, Newsweek ranked Barrington High School as  200 in an analysis of 14,454 U.S schools based on graduation rates, SAT scores, and AP participation rates.

Enrollment
As of the 2018-2019 school year, Barrington High School enrolls 1224 students and 136 faculty members: a student-teacher ratio of, roughly, 8:1. The student body of Barrington High School is mostly White, with a 6% Asian minority. Latino, African-American, and multiracial students together comprise about 5% of the student body.

Athletics
As of 2014, Barrington High School offered 20 varsity sports for boys and 3 varsity sports for girls. Run under the Barrington Boosters, these sports include cross country, soccer, football, field hockey, cheerleading, tennis, volleyball, swimming, track and field, basketball, wrestling, ice hockey, baseball, lacrosse, and softball. Barrington High School participates in the Rhode Island Interscholastic League and has won several championships since 2008.

Notable alumni
Brad Faxon, PGA graduated from the school in 1979.
Shanna Moakler, Former Miss USA and Playboy Magazine model, graduated from Barrington High School in 1993.
Brett Quigley, PGA professional golfer, graduated from Barrington High School in 1987.

Notes

References

Buildings and structures in Barrington, Rhode Island
Schools in Bristol County, Rhode Island
Public high schools in Rhode Island
National Register of Historic Places in Bristol County, Rhode Island